Dugway may refer to:
Dugway Proving Ground, a United States military weapons testing range in Utah
Dugway, Utah, a census-designated place near the Dugway Proving Grounds
Dugway Brook Watershed, a drainage basin in Cleveland, Ohio